Assassination Games is a 2011 American action thriller film directed by Ernie Barbarash and starring Jean-Claude van Damme and Scott Adkins with Ivan Kaye as their main antagonist. The film was released in the United States on July 29, 2011.

Premise
In France, Vincent Brazil (Jean-Claude Van Damme) is a contract killer, willing to take any job if the price is right. Roland Flint (Scott Adkins) retired from being a contract killer after an attack by drug kingpin Polo Yakur (Ivan Kaye) left Roland's wife Anna (Bianca Van Varenberg) in a coma that she still hasn't emerged from.

When a contract is put out on Yakur, both Vincent and Roland want to take the contract—Vincent is in it for the money, and Roland is in it to make Yakur pay for putting Anna in a coma.

With crooked Interpol agents and vicious members of the criminal underworld hot on their trail, Vincent and Roland reluctantly join forces to mow down their enemies so they can find and kill Yakur.

Cast
 Jean-Claude van Damme as Vincent Brazil
 Scott Adkins as Roland Flint
 Ivan Kaye as Polo Yakur
 Valentin Teodosiu as Blanchard
 Alin Panc as Kovacs
 Kevin Chapman as Culley
 Serban Celea as Wilson Herrod
 Michael Higgs as Godfrey
 Kris van Varenberg as Schell
 Marija Karan as October
 Bianca van Varenberg as Anna Flint
 Andrew French as Nalbandian

Production
Assassination Games began development under the working title The Weapon with Russel Mulcahy attached to direct.  Initially Steven Seagal had signed on to star alongside Van Damme.  After Seagal dropped out of the role, Vinnie Jones was considered to replace Steven Seagal, though the role eventually went to Scott Adkins.  Shooting took place in Bucharest, Romania, and New Orleans, Louisiana.

Release
The film had a limited release on July 29, 2011.  Sony Pictures Home Entertainment released the DVD  in the United States on September 6, 2011, and in the United Kingdom on October 10, 2011.

Reception
IGN gave the film a 6 out of 10 stars and wrote, "If you need a quick dose of action, Assassination Games should do the trick. Don't expect a masterpiece and you should walk away moderately pleased with the experience".  Rohit Rao of DVD Talk rated it 2 out of 5 stars and wrote, "Van Damme and Adkins show up to the party, game for anything, but director Ernie Barbarash insists on weighing them down with a convoluted script that mistakes meanness for grit."   Gabe Toro of Indiewire rated it C and wrote, "The fight choreography doesn’t lift this effort above Van Damme’s usual direct-to-DVD offerings, but it does prove that there are still filmmakers who understand how to shoot action."  Ike Oden of DVD Verdict described it as "a cheesy, pretentious, and poorly paced action film with a jet black nihilistic streak".

Ivan Kaye's performance as the main villain in this film has earned him special praise in a review from 2014 listing him as one of "The 10 Greatest Villains That Jean-Claude van Damme Has Ever Faced" and stating: "A brilliant casting choice and stand-out performance for an unusually drama-focused and underrated Van Damme film."

References

External links

 
 
 
 Soundtrack on iTunes

2011 films
2011 action thriller films
American films about revenge
Films about snipers
Films set in Bucharest
Films set in New Orleans
Films shot in Bucharest
Films shot in New Orleans
Films directed by Ernie Barbarash
Films about assassinations
American action thriller films
2010s English-language films
2010s American films